Borjgin Dashdorjiin Natsagdorj (17 November 1906 - 13 June 1937), was a Mongolian poet, writer, and playwright, and founder of the Mongolian Writer's Union.  He is considered one of the founding fathers of modern Mongolian literature and Mongolia's first "classic Socialist" writer. Also, he was master of the short essay.

Life 
Natsagdorj was born at a site of the lake Gün Galuutai in Darkhan Chin Wang khoshuu (what is now Bayandelger sum of Tov Province to the impoverished family of an untitled noble (hohi taiji). Because of the lack of formalized education in Mongolia at that time he received much of his early education from a tutor. From the age of 11, he worked in the Mongolian People's Army as a writer. Between 1926 and 1929, he stayed in Germany and France and set up the Mongolian Writers' Union. Starting 1930, Natsagdorj became more doubtful of leftist ideologies. He was arrested in 1932 but released again later the same year. He died on 13 June 1937, just 30 years old. The Mongolian Writer's Union erected a memorial monument on his birthplace in the Gün-Galuut Nature Reserve in 1981.

Work 

His poems cover a variety of topics including patriotic, revolutionary, educatory, cognitive and love romance. The poem "My Native Land", the most famous of his works, praise the beautiful variety of the country of Mongolia, factually listing all sites of Mongolia including the territories near the borders. A number of literature critics maintain that the poet drew an intangible border of Mongolia of his time in his poem. If this hypothesis is followed, it turns out that the poem claims the Sayan mountains as part of Mongolia.

His educatory poems can be viewed as PR for the European medicine that was introduced to Mongolia immediately following the revolution. The cognitive poems of the writer include such poems as "Star" and "The Painting on the Wall".

A tragic love story "The Three Sad Hills" (music by Damdinsüren and Smirnoff) became one of the most popular operas of Mongolia. The Opera House in Ulan Bator starts and finishes each year of its programme with this opera.

Sources

External links 
 Who Was Dashdorjiin Natsagdorj?
 Natsagdorj @ Elibrary.mn

Mongolian writers
Mongolian poets
1906 births
1937 deaths
People from Töv Province
20th-century Mongolian poets